Charles Frederick Dauphin III (February 17, 1974 – September 18, 2019) was an American sports and country music journalist. He was a radio broadcaster for WDKN in Dickson, Tennessee for 18 years, a radio show host and sports director at WNKX in Centerville for 10 years, and a contributing writer to Billboard from 2011 until his death. He received an Achievement Award at the 2014 Country Music Association Awards.

He died at Nashville's Alive Hospice following a series of complications from diabetes.

References

1974 births
2019 deaths
People from Dickson, Tennessee
Journalists from Tennessee
20th-century American journalists
21st-century American journalists
21st-century American male writers
20th-century American male writers
American radio journalists
American music journalists
American sportswriters
American male journalists